Scott Wynd (born 25 January 1970) is a former Australian rules footballer who played in the Australian Football League, playing with Footscray.

AFL career
Debuting in 1988, the 201 cm ruckman was the winner of the 1992 Brownlow Medal  after team mate Tony Liberatore won it in 1990. He was also the captain of Footscray/Western Bulldogs from 1994 until his retirement at the end of the 2000 season. Wynd is widely considered one of the best ruckmen of the modern era.

Playing statistics

|- style="background-color: #EAEAEA"
! scope="row" style="text-align:center" | 1988
|style="text-align:center;"|
| 52 || 1 || 0 || 0 || 4 || 0 || 4 || 0 || 0 || 0.0 || 0.0 || 4.0 || 0.0 || 4.0 || 0.0 || 0.0
|-
! scope="row" style="text-align:center" | 1989
|style="text-align:center;"|
| 15 || 20 || 5 || 3 || 94 || 125 || 219 || 67 || 25 || 0.3 || 0.2 || 4.7 || 6.3 || 11.0 || 3.4 || 1.3
|- style="background-color: #EAEAEA"
! scope="row" style="text-align:center" | 1990
|style="text-align:center;"|
| 15 || 14 || 1 || 0 || 58 || 105 || 163 || 42 || 15 || 0.1 || 0.0 || 4.1 || 7.5 || 11.6 || 3.0 || 1.1
|-
! scope="row" style="text-align:center" | 1991
|style="text-align:center;"|
| 15 || 20 || 5 || 1 || 85 || 255 || 340 || 135 || 23 || 0.3 || 0.1 || 4.3 || 12.8 || 17.0 || 6.8 || 1.2
|- style="background-color: #EAEAEA"
! scope="row" style="text-align:center" | 1992
|style="text-align:center;"|
| 15 || 24 || 0 || 0 || 155 || 278 || 433 || 143 || 28 || 0.0 || 0.0 || 6.5 || 11.6 || 18.0 || 6.0 || 1.2
|-
! scope="row" style="text-align:center" | 1993
|style="text-align:center;"|
| 15 || 19 || 2 || 0 || 108 || 189 || 297 || 107 || 27 || 0.1 || 0.0 || 5.7 || 9.9 || 15.6 || 5.6 || 1.4
|- style="background-color: #EAEAEA"
! scope="row" style="text-align:center" | 1994
|style="text-align:center;"|
| 15 || 9 || 9 || 3 || 31 || 40 || 71 || 24 || 6 || 1.0 || 0.3 || 3.4 || 4.4 || 7.9 || 2.7 || 0.7
|-
! scope="row" style="text-align:center" | 1995
|style="text-align:center;"|
| 15 || 19 || 2 || 1 || 94 || 163 || 257 || 72 || 17 || 0.1 || 0.1 || 4.9 || 8.6 || 13.5 || 3.8 || 0.9
|- style="background-color: #EAEAEA"
! scope="row" style="text-align:center" | 1996
|style="text-align:center;"|
| 15 || 21 || 0 || 0 || 71 || 200 || 271 || 67 || 19 || 0.0 || 0.0 || 3.4 || 9.5 || 12.9 || 3.2 || 0.9
|-
! scope="row" style="text-align:center" | 1997
|style="text-align:center;"|
| 15 || 23 || 3 || 2 || 97 || 194 || 291 || 83 || 30 || 0.1 || 0.1 || 4.2 || 8.4 || 12.7 || 3.6 || 1.3
|- style="background-color: #EAEAEA"
! scope="row" style="text-align:center" | 1998
|style="text-align:center;"|
| 15 || 22 || 1 || 1 || 83 || 240 || 323 || 78 || 18 || 0.0 || 0.0 || 3.8 || 10.9 || 14.7 || 3.5 || 0.8
|-
! scope="row" style="text-align:center" | 1999
|style="text-align:center;"|
| 15 || 23 || 1 || 0 || 85 || 183 || 268 || 47 || 24 || 0.0 || 0.0 || 3.7 || 8.0 || 11.7 || 2.0 || 1.0
|- style="background-color: #EAEAEA"
! scope="row" style="text-align:center" | 2000
|style="text-align:center;"|
| 15 || 22 || 2 || 2 || 75 || 128 || 203 || 56 || 33 || 0.1 || 0.1 || 3.4 || 5.8 || 9.2 || 2.5 || 1.5
|- class="sortbottom"
! colspan=3| Career
! 237
! 31
! 13
! 1040
! 2100
! 3140
! 921
! 265
! 0.1
! 0.1
! 4.4
! 8.9
! 13.2
! 3.9
! 1.1
|}

Honours and achievements

Individual
Brownlow Medal: 1992
Charles Sutton Medal (Footscray F.C. Best & Fairest): 1992
All-Australian: 1992
Footscray F.C./Western Bulldogs Captain: 1994-2000
Footscray F.C. Team of the Century - Interchange

Family
Wynd's father Garrey Wynd played two games for Melbourne in 1966 and his brother Paul Wynd played three games for North Melbourne in 1997.

References

External links 
 

1970 births
Living people
Western Bulldogs players
Brownlow Medal winners
All-Australians (AFL)
Charles Sutton Medal winners
Australian rules footballers from Melbourne
Jacana Football Club players
Victorian State of Origin players
People from the City of Hume